Thad McArthur (born November 23, 1928) is an American modern pentathlete. He competed at the 1952 Summer Olympics.

References

1928 births
Living people
American male modern pentathletes
Olympic modern pentathletes of the United States
Modern pentathletes at the 1952 Summer Olympics
Sportspeople from Seattle
20th-century American people